Tracyanne Campbell (born 18 May 1974) is a Scottish singer and musician who is the lead vocalist of the Glasgow-based indie pop band Camera Obscura.

Born in Glasgow, Campbell founded Camera Obscura alongside John Henderson and Gavin Dunbar in 1996. The band released Biggest Bluest Hi Fi, Underachievers Please Try Harder, Let's Get Out of This Country, My Maudlin Career and Desire Lines. They have worked beside Tucker Martine, Stuart Murdoch and Peter Bjorn and John.

Campbell spoke of the loss she felt after bandmate and friend Carey Lander died in 2015. In an interview with "The Guardian", Campbell said "We were all robbed of Carey". Campbell also wrote Lander's obituary for the newspaper.

In 2016 Campbell married her longtime boyfriend, music therapist Tim Davidson, at Brooklyn Borough Hall. The two have a son.

Most recently she has worked on the project Tracyanne & Danny alongside English musician Danny Coughlan. In May 2018 they released their self-titled album on Merge Records.

References

British indie pop musicians
Living people
Scottish pop singers
1974 births
Musicians from Glasgow
British indie rock musicians
21st-century Scottish singers